Kevin Francis Whitehead (born April 27, 1952 in New York City) is an American jazz critic and author.

Biography
Whitehead studied at Oswego State University in New York, then earned a Masters in American Literature and Culture at Syracuse University. He began writing in the early 1970s for the short-lived magazine Oswego County Times. In 1979, he wrote his first record review, for Joni Mitchell's Mingus.

Since the end of the 1970s, Whitehead has been writing regularly on jazz, including for the NPR program Fresh Air with Terry Gross since 1987, as well as for newspapers and magazines such as JazzTimes, Chicago Sun-Times, Chicago Reader, Down Beat, Village Voice, and the Volkskrant. He lived in the Netherlands in the late 1990s.

Whitehead wrote the books New Dutch Swing (1998) and Why Jazz: A Concise Guide (2010) and (with the photographer Ton Mijs) Instant Composers Pool Orchestra: You Have to See It (2011). He is also editor of Bimhuis 25: Stories of Twenty-Five Years at the Bimhuis. His works have appeared in anthologies such as Jazz: The First Century, The Gramophone Jazz Good CD Guide, Mixtery: a Commemorative for Anthony Braxton, Da Capo's Best Music Writing 2006 and Traveling the Spaceways: Sun Ra , the Astro Black and other Solar Myths.

Whitehead has also written liner notes for albums, including recordings by Ab Baars, Sylvie Courvoisier, Charles Gayle, François Houle, Phillip Johnston, Sheila Jordan, Henry Threadgill, Myra Melford (Michael Moore, 1993), Simon Nabatov / Han Bennink, Pharoah Sanders, Daniel Schnyder, Aki Takase, the Ethnic Heritage Ensemble, Clusone 3, and the ICP Orchestra. In 2012 he was nominated for the JJA Award of the Jazz Journalists Association for his liner notes of the Sam Rivers album Trilogy (Mosaic Select). He also taught jazz literature at Towson University, University of Kansas, and Goucher College.

As an improvisational musician, Whitehead played in the free jazz group Starship Beer, as well as appearing at New York's Knitting Factory, Chicago's Empty Bottle and HotHouse, and the Amsterdam Zaal 100. He lives near Baltimore.

Publications
 New Dutch Swing: An in-depth examination of Amsterdam's vital and distinctive jazz scene. Billboard Books, New York 1998, .
 Kevin Whitehead, Herman te Loo, John Corbett: Bimhuis 25. Stories of twenty five years at the Bimhuis. Bimhuis, Amsterdam 1999, .
 Why Jazz?: A Concise Guide. Oxford University Press, 2011, .

References

External links 
Kevin Whitehead at NPR

American music critics
Musicians from New York City
1952 births
Living people